John Glanville Phillips (8 November 1910 – 26 June 1985) was a South African cricketer who played 16 matches of first-class cricket for Border and Transvaal between 1931 and 1938.

John Phillips was an opening batsman and left-arm wrist-spinner. His best batting performance was 100 and 36 for Border against Orange Free State in 1933–34. In the 1934–35 season he took 15 wickets in two matches in East London in just over a week: 7 for 51 and 2 for 87 in a victory over Orange Free State, then 5 for 123 and 1 for 44 in a close loss to Natal. These performances led the cricket writer Louis Duffus to name him as a player "who is sure to be heard of in subsequent seasons". However, Phillips played only two more first-class matches.

References

External links

1910 births
1985 deaths
South African cricketers
Border cricketers
Gauteng cricketers
Cricketers from East London, Eastern Cape